Bilal Basham Askani (born 7 April 1991) is a Bahraini handball player for Al-Najma and the Bahraini national team.

He participated at the 2017 World Men's Handball Championship.

References

External links

 
 
 

1991 births
Living people
Bahraini male handball players
Asian Games silver medalists for Bahrain
Asian Games medalists in handball
Medalists at the 2018 Asian Games
Handball players at the 2018 Asian Games
Olympic handball players of Bahrain
Handball players at the 2020 Summer Olympics
21st-century Bahraini people